Internet filtering in Indonesia was deemed "substantial" in the social arena, "selective" in the political and internet tools arenas, and there was no evidence of filtering in the conflict/security arena by the OpenNet Initiative in 2011 based on testing done during 2009 and 2010. Testing also showed that Internet filtering in Indonesia is unsystematic and inconsistent, illustrated by the differences found in the level of filtering between ISPs.
Indonesia was rated "partly free" in Freedom on the Net 2020 with a score of 49, midway between the end of the "free" range at 30 and the start of the "not free" range at 60.

Although the government of Indonesia holds a positive view about the internet as a means for economic development, it has become increasingly concerned over the impact of access to information. It has shown an interest in increasing its control over offensive online content, particularly pornographic and anti-Islamic online content. The government regulates such content through legal and regulatory frameworks and partnerships with ISP and Internet cafes.

Muhammad imagery restrictions
Media reported that selective blocking of some web sites for brief periods began in 2007–2008. Indonesia ordered ISPs to block YouTube in April 2008 after Google reportedly did not respond to the government's request to remove the film Fitna by the Dutch parliamentarian Geert Wilders, which purportedly mocked the Islamic prophet, Muhammad. In May 2010, when an account on Facebook promoted a competition to draw Muhammad, government officials took a more focused approach and sent a letter to Facebook urging closure of the account, asked all ISPs to limit access to the account's link, and invited the Indonesian Association of Internet Cafe Entrepreneurs to restrict access to the group. Due to opposition from bloggers and civil societies, however, ISPs disregarded the government's requests, and the account remained accessible.

ITE Law
In March 2008, the government passed the Law on Information and Electronic Transactions (ITE Law), which broadened the authority of the Ministry of Communications and Information Technology (MCI) to include supervision of the flow of information and possible censorship of online content. In early 2010, the ministry published a draft Regulation on Multimedia Content that, if implemented, would require ISPs to filter or otherwise remove specific materials. The types of content listed include vaguely-worded categories such as pornography, gambling, hate incitement, threats of violence, exposure of private information, intellectual property, false information, and contents that degrade a person or group based on a physical or nonphysical attribute, such as disability. Following public outcry, the government announced that it would take time to process suggestions from the public before proceeding with the draft regulation.

Under the ITE Law, anyone convicted of committing defamation online faces up to six years in prison, and a fine of up to one billion rupiah (US$111,000). As of June 2010, there were at least eight cases in which citizens had been indicted on defamation charges under the ITE Law for comments on e-mail lists, blogs, or Facebook. Prosecutions under the ITE Law have contributed to an increased atmosphere of fear, caution, and self-censorship among online writers and average users.

Notable blocks
In 2014, amid an online porn crackdown, Vimeo, Reddit and Imgur were blocked.

In 2017, Telegram was blocked, as it was being used to spread "radical and terrorist propaganda." Telegram was later unblocked after several agreements with the government.

As of September 2018, some websites including Vimeo and Tumblr are censored as the government accused them of hosting content that includes nudity. Tumblr was put back uncensored on December 17, 2018.

On 22 May 2019, Indonesian government blocked Facebook, WhatsApp, and Instagram for three days after the 22 May riots in Jakarta to prevent hoaxes and fake news of the situation during the riots from spreading. The event also increased awareness of using VPN to access blocked content during the block.

On 22 August 2019, amid Papua protests, Indonesia's Communication Ministry said that on the previous night they cut off telecommunication data and Internet in Papua to "curb hoax and most importantly stop people from sharing provocative messages that can incite racial hatred" until and "if the situation has calmed". As of 2 September 2019, the Internet blackout was ongoing. The government announced a ban on fake news and the "carrying out or spreading separatism in expressing opinions in public".

MR5 
In November 2020, Ministerial Regulation 5 (MR5) was implemented, introducing a number of major obligations on all private electronic service operators (ESOs) that do business in Indonesia. All ESOs must register with the Ministry of Communication and Information Technology (Kominfo), and provide direct access to electronic systems and data to Kominfo and law enforcement when requested. ESOs must have at least one designee within the country to serve as a point of contact for their obligations. ESOs must not provide access to or "informing ways" of "prohibited content", defined as any content which violates Indonesian law or regulations, or creates "community anxiety" or "disturbance in public order". ESOs must also proactively monitor their services to prevent the dissemination of prohibited content. ESOs must comply with takedown requests for content that "disturbs the community or public order" within 24 hours of receipt, and child sexual abuse images, terrorism content, or any content that critically "disturbs the community or public order", within four hours. Violations of these obligations, including the obligation to register, are subject to fines and blockage.

MR5 has been criticised by human rights and free speech organisations such as Article 19 and the Electronic Frontier Foundation for its wide scope, mandating all internet services to be registered with the government, and the vague definition of "prohibited" content. In late-June 2022, Kominfo announced a 27 July 2022 deadline before it would begin blocking services for failure to register. On 30 July it was reported that Kominfo had ordered the blockage of eight ESOs, including Electronic Arts' Origin, Epic Games, PayPal, Valve Software (Steam and published games Counter-Strike: Global Offensive and Dota 2),  Xandr, and Yahoo!. Valve Corporation and Yahoo!'s blocks have been lifted since 2 August.

References